Cypress College is a public community college in Cypress, California. It is part of the California Community Colleges System and belongs to the North Orange County Community College District. It offers a variety of general education (55 associate degrees), transfer courses (58 transfer majors), and 145 vocational programs leading to associate degrees and certificates.

History 
The college opened on September 12, 1966.

Campus 
It features several futuristic-looking buildings set around a central lake. The college is noteworthy in that it has never completely abandoned the style of buildings it was initially created with. The new library, which opened on January 30, 2006, still bears heavy resemblance to the school's original buildings, though the use of concrete is de-emphasized in favor of glass.

Cypress College is located in the shadow of major tourist attractions such as Disney's theme parks and Downtown Disney (about six miles), Knotts' Berry Farm (less than five miles), and The Outlets at Orange entertainment complex (about 10 miles). The campus is 12 miles from the beach and is close to Long Beach, California and Los Angeles. The campus is located at 9200 Valley View Street in the city of Cypress.

Organization and administration 
Cypress College operates with a decentralized approach of separate academic "divisions," allowing the benefits of both a small and large college campus. Each of the campus' instructional buildings was designed with a commons area where students with similar majors could meet and study.

The college is a part of the North Orange County Community College District. The campus is also part of the California Community College System.

Campus presidents 
 Dan Walker, 1967-1970
 Omar Scheidt, 1970–1977
 Don Bedard, 1977–1978 ¹
 Jack Scott, 1978–1987
 Elma Clamp, 1987–1988 ¹
 Kirk Avery, 1988–1992
 Tom Harris, Jr., 1992–1994 ¹
 Christine Johnson, 1995–1998
 Don Bedard, 1998–1999 ¹
 Margie Lewis, 1999–2007
 Michael J. Kasler, 2007–2012
 Bob Simpson, 2012–2017
 JoAnna Schilling, 2017–present

¹ Served in an interim capacity.

Academics
Cypress College's student population reaches nearly 17,000 per semester, though that number has fluctuated (experiencing historically high levels in 2010 and going as low as 12,500) in recent years based on the level of state funding provided and other economic factors. Spring 2012 enrollment was approximately 15,000.

The college features a strong mix of ethnic diversity in its student population: 33% are Caucasian, 27% are Latino, 19% are Asian/Pacific Islander, 8% are Filipino, 6% are African American, and 5% are from other ethnicities or their ethnicity is unidentified.

The college is a Training Center for the National Alternative Fuels Training Consortium. Cypress College Registered Nursing program graduates scored a 97.26% pass-rate in the 2004/2005 test years, 95.38% pass-rate for 2005/2006 test years, and 98.91% pass rate in the 2006/2007 test years on the State of California Board of Registered Nursing NCLEX state licensure examination. Approximately 24% of students fail the RN program.

Cypress College is home to the only mortuary science program in the greater Orange County and Greater Los Angeles areas, and is one of only two such public programs in the state of California.

Library 
The Cypress College Library has a collection of approximately 70,000 books, 5,000 periodicals (mainly online), a large collection of reference works, and a variety of DVDs. The library offers students free 24/7 access to electronic databases with full text magazine, newspaper, journal, and encyclopedia articles. The library's special collections/archives houses materials that hold value to the college. These collections are not open to the public.

Student life

Sports 
Cypress College has 13 intercollegiate teams, including men's and women's teams. The athletics teams are nicknamed the Chargers. For men the school offers baseball, basketball, golf, soccer, swim & dive, and tennis. Women are offered basketball, soccer, softball, swim & dive, tennis, volleyball, and water polo. These programs have attained 73 conference titles and 24 state championships.

Clubs 
There are many clubs offered at Cypress College. Clubs active as of fall 2013 are the Anime Club, Associated Mathematicians of Cypress College, Black Student Union (BSU), Campus Christians, Engineering and Physics Club (EPC), Honors Club, Human Services Club, International Club, Muslim Students Association (MSA), and Psychology Club.

Arts 
Cypress College hosts student performances, exhibitions and events throughout the year. Theater, dance and music studies culminate in student performances held in the Cypress College theaters and recital hall. The Cypress College Art Gallery and the Edouard de Merlier Photography Gallery host annual student exhibitions at the end of every Spring semester, showcasing student work from the Art, Media Arts Design and Photography departments. The college also holds its Annual Film Festival every Spring semester which premieres short films made by Media Arts Design students.

Notable alumni 

 Scott Aukerman – Creator and star, Comedy Bang Bang
 Jason Bates – Major League Baseball player, Colorado Rockies
 Greg Cannom - Three time Academy Award Winning Makeup Artist, Mrs. Doubtfire, Bram Stoker's Dracula, and The Curious Case of Benjamin Button
 Caitlin Doughty – mortician, author and promoter of death acceptance and alternative funeral practices
 Brian Downing – Major League Baseball player, California Angels
 Mark Eaton – National Basketball Association center, Utah Jazz
 Ben Francisco – Major League Baseball player, Philadelphia Phillies
 Keith Ginter – Major League Baseball player, Oakland Athletics
 Charles Gipson – Major League Baseball player
 Carla Harvey – singer in the band Butcher Babies
 Vince Hizon – professional basketball player
 Trevor Hoffman – Major League Baseball pitcher, San Diego Padres and Milwaukee Brewers
 Geri Jewell – actor and comedian best known for roles on The Facts of Life and HBO's Deadwood
 Brandon Laird – Major League Baseball player
 Gerald Laird – Major League Baseball player
 Steven Lee – multi-platinum music producer
 Alon Leichman –  Olympian, member of the Israel national baseball team, and assistant pitching coach for the Cincinnati Reds
 Pat Martin – radio personality, Sacramento, KRXQ
 Keith McDonald –  Major League Baseball player
 Swen Nater - American Basketball Association and National Basketball Association player
 David Newhan – Major League Baseball player, Houston Astros  (attended)
 Augie Ojeda – Major League Baseball player, Arizona Diamondbacks
 Jeff Patterson – Major League Baseball player, New York Yankees
 John Sexton (photographer) - Photographer
 Steve Smyth – Major League Baseball player, Chicago Cubs 
 Eric Stefani – musician, formerly of No Doubt
 Cory Sullivan – Major League Baseball player, Houston Astros
 Kirsten Vangsness – actress on the CBS drama series Criminal Minds
 Jason Vargas (born 1983) - baseball pitcher for the Philadelphia Phillies
 George Zeber – Major League Baseball player, New York Yankees

References

External links 
 Official website

 
California Community Colleges
Universities and colleges in Orange County, California
Cypress, California
1966 establishments in California
Educational institutions established in 1966
Two-year colleges in the United States